Ingogo may refer to:

 Ingogo, a South African locality.
 Ingogo (company), an Australian business.